Abu Tahir Tarsusi was an Iranian story-teller and writer of the 12th century.

No information exists about his life. His nisba Tarsusi (also spelled Tartusi) indicates a connection to either Tarsus in Asia Minor or Tartus in Syria. His parents, or perhaps himself, may have resettled in Asia Minor or Syria. During this period, this area served as a fronter region between the Muslims and Christians, and was constantly affected by war and raids. Rule over the area shifted various times between the Byzantine Empire and numerous Muslim states. This made the Muslim residents migrate to other Muslim lands, and Abu Tahir, or his ancestors, were one of those people. Some of Abu Tahir's stories indicate that was an adherant of Shia Islam.

Abu Tahir's Iranian background is confirmed by his grasp over the Persian language, as well as the theme of his stories, such as the Darab-nama and Qahraman-nama, both of which are mainly focused on historical or legendary figures of ancient Iran.

Abu Tahir is known to have written seven books.

References

Sources 
 

12th-century Iranian people